John Anthony Rickard (born 12 July 1945) is a British economist, and Chair of Higher Education Governing Council of Melbourne Institute of Technology, Australia. Previously, he has been Vice Chancellor at Central Queensland University and the University of Southern Queensland, Dean at Monash University, Director of the Graduate School of Management at Deakin University and Foundation Professor (Financial Economics) at the University of Melbourne.

The author of three books and 81 articles, Professor Rickard has been an advisor to the governments of Victoria and Queensland on education and financial matters.

Rickard was born in Birmingham.  He read Mathematics at Queen Elizabeth College, University of London, where he was awarded a BSc (1st Class Honours) in 1966.  He completed his studies at University College, London.  His Thesis was a study of "Planetary Waves."

John and his wife Veronica first arrived in Australia aboard the Angelina Lauro in Fremantle in 1966 and first settled in Bulleen, Victoria, where John took up a lectureship in Mathematics.

Much of Professor Rickard's work in economics focuses on the development and validation of empirical models for customer repurchase decisions.  Rickard was among the first to establish that customer satisfaction does not influence repurchase decisions directly, but rather indirectly via brand preference.

External links
 John Rickard's CV
  Arrival in Australia Details
 Customer repurchase intention A general structural equation model

1945 births
Living people
Australian economists
British expatriate academics
English economists
Recipients of the Centenary Medal
Academic staff of Central Queensland University
Academic staff of Deakin University
Academic staff of the University of Southern Queensland
Financial economists
English emigrants to Australia
Alumni of Queen Elizabeth College
Writers from Birmingham, West Midlands
Alumni of University College London